Halogen TV was an American digital cable and satellite television channel that aired feature-length films, documentaries, short films, and original reality programs that centered on making positive social changes and making the world a better place.

In December 2012, Halogen, along with the Documentary Channel, was acquired by Participant Media and re-branded as Pivot, a channel aimed at young adults between 18 and 34 years old. The combined channel debuted on August 1, 2013. Pivot ceased operations on October 31, 2016 folding the former Halogen TV channel space.

Programming

Former

 Angry Planet
 Art Race
 Behind the Label
 Boardfree
 Departures
 Extreme Dreams
 Fink
 Food Jammers
 Glutton for Punishment
 Invisible Children
 Jump Shipp (Original)
 Noble Exchange (Original)
 Penny Revolution
 ReGenesis
 Serve the City
 Tainted Love (Original)
 The Un-Road Trip

References

External links

Defunct television networks in the United States
Television channels and stations established in 2009
Television channels and stations disestablished in 2013